DZEQ (93.7 FM) Radyo Pilipinas is a radio station owned and operated by Philippine Broadcasting Service in the Philippines. Its studio and transmitter are located along Polo Field Rd., Brgy. Pacdal, Baguio.

References

See also
PTV 8 Cordillera

Radio stations in Baguio
Radio stations established in 1965
Philippine Broadcasting Service
People's Television Network
News and talk radio stations in the Philippines
1965 establishments in the Philippines